Clifford Lewis (born 17 November 1942) is a Dominican cricketer. He played in one first-class match for the Windward Islands in 1960/61.

See also
 List of Windward Islands first-class cricketers

References

External links
 

1942 births
Living people
Dominica cricketers
Windward Islands cricketers